Maciej Małkowski (born March 19, 1985, in Jastrzębie-Zdrój) is a Polish footballer who plays as a midfielder for Barciczanka Barcice.

Career

Club
In June 2011, he joined Zagłębie Lubin on a two-year contract.

National team
Małkowski debuted for Poland in December 2008 against Serbia.

References

External links
 
 

1985 births
Living people
Polish footballers
Poland international footballers
Odra Wodzisław Śląski players
GKS Bełchatów players
Zagłębie Lubin players
Górnik Zabrze players
Sandecja Nowy Sącz players
Ekstraklasa players
I liga players
People from Jastrzębie-Zdrój
Sportspeople from Silesian Voivodeship
Association football midfielders